James Petersen may refer to:

 Jim Petersen (born 1962), American basketball player and coach
 Pete Petersen (politician) (James F. Petersen, born 1950), American politician
 James Petersen (anthropologist) (1954–2005), American anthropologist and archaeologist